HK-SF Ocean Film Festival  is an annual film festival organised by the Ocean Recovery Alliance in collaboration with the San Francisco Ocean Film Festival. Featured films focus on a wide range of ocean-related topics from wildlife and conservation to culture, adventure and oceanic sports. The Hong Kong San Francisco film festival will be run again in April 2013.

2012 Film Festival
The first festival was March 9–22, 2012, and was Asia's first ocean-themed film festival.

Films

 A Sheltered Sea 
 A Wave of Change
 Aquaville
 The Baja Wave Document
 The Bay vs The Bag
 Bicycle Trip
 The Board Meeting
 The Coral Gardener
 The Comfort of Cold
 Deep Dive
 East Scheldt: Discovery Underwater
 The End of the Line 
 Fin
 Finding a Balance in Rough Waters
 Fish Wars
 Going Vertical
 Héen Táak
 Home for Hawksbill
 I Just Love to Paddle
 In the Eye of the Whale
 In the Wake of Giants
 Into the Deep with Elephant Seals
 Kai Lenny: 4 in 1
 La Pesca Vivencial
 The Majestic Plastic Bag
 Manta – Ray of Hope
 Mission of Mermaids
 One River
 Plastic Tide
 Requiem
 Sanctuary: The Last Stand for Sharks
 Sanctuary in the Sea
 Save Our Sharks
 Shaping a Life
 Shifting Baselines
 The Southern Passage
 Surfbus
 Surfing Dolphins
 Terra Antarctica
 Tide is Turning
 To Save the Whale
 What Would Darwin Think?
 Wow Anilau

2013 Film Festival
The second annual HK-SF Ocean Film Festival is planned for April 2013.

References

External links
 Ocean Recovery Alliance
 San Francisco Ocean Film Festival

Cinema of the San Francisco Bay Area